Gaston Butter (born 1888, date of death unknown) was a Belgian weightlifter. He competed in the men's lightweight event at the 1924 Summer Olympics.

References

External links
 

1888 births
Year of death missing
Belgian male weightlifters
Olympic weightlifters of Belgium
Weightlifters at the 1924 Summer Olympics
Place of birth missing